Bar Hill is a purpose-built village with a population of 4,000 about 4 miles (7 km) northwest of Cambridge, England on the A14 road, just east of the Prime Meridian.

History

Prior to the building of the Bar Hill settlement the area was occupied by Bar Farm, named after the toll bar that was in place along the Roman Road running immediately to the North of the site. The farm house and toll gate still remain in the village.

Planning for the village began in the late 1950s to alleviate the housing shortage in South Cambridgeshire.  350 acres of land was purchased from Chivers Ltd. in the parish of Dry Drayton in 1959, and a village was planned of a self-contained community of approximately 1,200 residences, all leasehold, located in closes on the interior of an outer ring road. In the face of opposition from nearby Cambridge City Council, the plan was approved in 1964, building work started in 1965, and the first residents arrived in May 1967. Cubitts, the original developer, sold the project to Trafalgar House in 1968 following slower than expected growth, and building work was paused for 18 months after only 180 houses had been completed. The same year a shopping mall of 14 shops, including a supermarket, was opened in the centre of the village, and a primary school was opened.

The village grew rapidly in the 1970s, including the completion of a pub, a church, and a hotel with its own golf course, and by 1975 there was a population of 1,673 in its 599 homes. The village's original supermarket closed in 1976, but was replaced in 1977 by a very large branch of Tesco, accompanied by an extensive car park. A village hall was completed in 1979, and expansion continued in the 1980s, with further transfer of land from Dry Drayton. In 1989 the final house of the original plan was completed, 23 years after building had begun and 15 years after its planned completion. The population was at that time over 5,000.

The village was built on or around one of the many hills in the area, hence the name "Bar Hill". It is accessible on the B1050 road, off A14 exit 25 (formerly 29 before the A14 C2H Improvements).

Bar Hill is a unique residential area.  There are abundant open green spaces among the neighbourhoods with connecting paths.  The 1700+ residences include a mixture of detached, semi detached and terraced, that unlike newer planned housing estates, are placed in an uncrowded, spacious manner.  A ring road encompasses the village with roads to the housing that project off it, like spokes on a wheel. These roads end in cul-de-sacs bordering the village green in the centre.  With no through roads, the residential areas are quiet with only local traffic.

2014 Flood
On 8 August 2014 the village came to national prominence when over 100mm of rain fell in a period of approximately 30 minutes, causing many parts of the village to become flooded.

Village life
The village has a shopping mall (with a large Tesco Extra supermarket as anchor store), library (in which a post office is also located), primary school, multi-denominational church (rebuilt in 1991) and a pub called The Fox.  The village has 2 main playgrounds just off the Village Green  with smaller equipment spread out throughout the village green spaces. There is an enclosed Astro football pitch and 2 tennis courts.  A skate park was built in the village but was demolished as it became too expensive to keep up. However a residents Committee has been established to explore the construction of a new facility.  There is also a championship 18 hole golf course and hotel. The village also has two fields (one large field known to locals mostly as "The village green" and the smaller school playing field located near the farmhouse) which are used to host sporting events and council events such as the annual village fête.

It has a cycle path to Dry Drayton, known as The Drift. There is also a footpath that leads to the small village of Lolworth.

Bar Hill was originally contained within a ring road when it was first developed, but with the expansion and development of the area, it began to spill out. For example the "Gleneagles" development overlooking the golf course.

In 2017, Bar Hill was one of many areas that benefitted by the A14 Cambridge to Huntingdon Improvement Scheme which was completed in 2020.

See also
Cambourne, another, later, planned village in South Cambridgeshire
Northstowe, a planned town in South Cambridgeshire close to Bar Hill

References

External links
Bar Hill Village Site 
Bar Hill Cricket Club
Bar Hill Church
Bar Hill Primary School

Populated places established in 1967
Villages in Cambridgeshire
Civil parishes in Cambridgeshire
South Cambridgeshire District